Sultan bin Salman Al Saud (Sulṭān bin Salmān Āl Suʿūd; born 27 June 1956) is a Saudi prince and former Royal Saudi Air Force pilot who flew aboard the American STS-51-G Space Shuttle mission as a payload specialist. He is the first member of a royal family to fly in space, the first Arab to fly in space, and the first Muslim to fly in space, as well as (at 28 years old) the youngest person ever to fly on the Space Shuttle. On 27 December 2018, he was appointed as chairman of the Board of Directors of the Saudi Space Commission at the rank of minister. He is the eldest surviving son of King Salman.

Early life and education
Sultan was born in Riyadh on 27 June 1956, as the second son of Prince Salman, then governor of Riyadh province (currently King of Saudi Arabia). His mother was Sultana bint Turki Al Sudairi. She was a daughter of King Salman's uncle, Turki bin Ahmed Al Sudairi, who was one of the former governors of al-Jouf, Jizan and Asir Province and was a participant in the unification campaign under his cousin, the founder of the Kingdom Abdulaziz ibn Saud. Prince Sultan is a full brother of Fahd, Ahmed, Abdulaziz, Faisal and Hassa.

Sultan completed his elementary and secondary education in Riyadh, He received a bachelor's degree in mass communications from the University of Denver and a master's degree in social and political science with distinction from Syracuse University in 1999.

Early experience
Sultan bin Salman started his career in 1982 as a researcher in the department of international communications at the Ministry of Information in Saudi Arabia. His tenure lasted until 1984. He served as deputy director of the Saudi media committee for the Saudi athletes participating in the 1984 Summer Olympics in Los Angeles. Later that year, the department of TV advertising was created at the Ministry of Information, and he was appointed its acting director.

From 17 June through 24 June 1985, he flew as a payload specialist on STS-51-G Discovery. As one of a seven-member international crew, which also included American and French astronauts, he represented the Arab Satellite Communications Organization (ARABSAT) in deploying its satellite, ARABSAT-1B.

Later, he assisted in establishing the Association of Space Explorers, an international organization comprising all astronauts and cosmonauts who have been in space.  Currently, Sultan is a member of ASE's International Executive Committee.

In 1985, Sultan recorded a commercial message that was broadcast on MTV during the Live Aid concert event. His message mentioned his recent trip on the Space Shuttle and was one of 33 such by notable individuals including Shimon Peres, Cesar Chavez, Sean Penn, Coretta Scott King, Leonard Nimoy, Sting, Archbishop Desmond Tutu, David Bowie, Javier Pérez de Cuéllar, Bono, Patsy Mink, Erich Honecker, Boy George, O.J. Simpson, Mick Jagger, Tom Cruise, Carl Sagan, Margaret Thatcher, Jimmy Carter, Jesse Jackson, Ronald Reagan, David Lee Roth, and Peter Ueberroth. Sultan bin Salman served in the Royal Saudi Air Force beginning in 1985 and held the rank of lieutenant colonel. He retired from the air force in 1996 with the rank of colonel.

At the time of his space flight, Sultan had over 1,000 cumulative hours of flight time; as of February 2020, he has over 8,000 flight hours as a military and civilian pilot.

Positions
In December 2018, he was the chairman of the board of the Saudi Space Commission. From 2009 until joining the space commission, Sultan bin Salman served as the president and chairman of the Saudi Commission for Tourism and National Heritage (SCTH). He served as the commission's secretary general since its inception in 2000. As secretary-general, he contributed significantly to the improvement of Saudi Arabia's tourism and national heritage strategy, and organizational building and innovation in the Saudi government.

On 3 May 2021, Sultan bin Salman was appointed as special advisor to the King with a rank of minister, and chairman of the board of trustees of King Salman Foundation, a newly established non-profit organization.

Books
Sultan bin Salman Al Saud has written several books:

 Early Documents in (Saudi) Architectural Legacy (وثائق مبكرة في مسيرة التراث العمراني) (2010)
 The Architectural Heritage (سيرة في التراث العمراني) (2010)
 One planet, the story of the first Arab mission to space (2011), together with Ahmed Nabil Abo Khatwa and Tarek Ali Fadaak
 The Possible Imagination (الخيال الممكن)

He also edited the book by Facey, William, Back to Earth: Adobe Building in Saudi Arabia, Riyadh: Al Turath Foundation (2015).

Personal life
Sultan bin Salman is married to Princess Haifa, daughter of Prince Saud bin Faisal, the former minister of foreign affairs of Saudi Arabia and the son of King Faisal. They have three children. His son, Salman (born 1990), attended St. Andrew's University in Scotland and Oxford University and married a daughter of Prince Khalid bin Saud Al Saud, a great-grandson of Mohammed bin Abdul Rahman, the brother of King Abdulaziz, in Riyadh on 5 December 2012. His daughter (born 1994) also attended St. Andrews University.

Sultan enjoys flying, gliding, skiing, and exploring nature in his spare time. He owns a farm in Diriyah which is a model of modern facilities in a historical setting. His farm reflects his attempt to retrace the origins of the Al Saud family, and to document the Al Saud's claims over the Najd.

Awards
Sultan has received the following awards/recognition:
 The King Abdulaziz Sash, KSA (1985)
 Certificate of Appreciation, NASA (1985)
 NASA Space Flight Medal (1985)
 Officier de la Légion d’Honneur (1985)
 Resolution by the House of Representatives of Massachusetts, USA commending the first Saudi Arabian Astronaut in space (1985)
 First Class Order of the Republic, Republic of Tunisia (1985)
 Al Bahrain Medal First Class, Bahrain (1985)
 Hilal-I Pakistan (Order of Pakistan) Pakistan (1986)
 Key to the County of Los Angeles, California, U.S.A (1986)
 Key to the City of Dallas, Texas, USA (1986)
 Honorary PhD, The King Fahd University of Petroleum and Minerals (1987)
 Golden Medal of Science and Art, Sudan (1987)
 Independence Medal First Class, United Arab Emirates (1987)
 Medal of National Arts, Lebanon (1987)
 Sultan Qaboos Medal, Sultanate of Oman (1987)
 Independence Sash, State of Qatar (1987)
 Medal of Sash First Class, State of Kuwait (1987)
 Order of Merit First Class, Republic of Yemen (1987)
 Medal of Stars, Grand Sash, China (1987)
 Iraqi Air Force Badge, Republic of Iraq (1987)
 Order of the Throne, Kingdom of Morocco (1987)
 Military Honor Medal, Syrian Arab Republic (1988)
 Commandeur de l’Ordre de la Grande Étoile de Djibouti – Republic of Djibouti
 Medal for Participation in the Gulf War, State of Kuwait (1993)
 Liberation of Kuwait Medal, Second Class, State of Kuwait (1993)
 Liberation of Kuwait Medal, Saudi Armed Forces (1993)
 Certificate of Recognition, Space Studies Institute, Princeton, USA
 Man of the Year for Benevolent Work 1997 – “In recognition of contributions to the Disabled” - Al Majallah Magazine, 21 December 1997, Issue No. 932.
 Certificate of Recognition, “For outstanding leadership and inspiration dedicated to improving the quality of life for the mentally and physically challenged”, Temple University School of Podiatric Medicine, USA (1999)
 Honorary Shield, Leading personalities in the Arab Tourism Sector, Arab World Tourism and Travel Exhibition, Lebanon. (2003)
 “Man of the Year 2003” Prize in the field of Information Technology in the Kingdom offered by ITP Co. (2004)
 Wisam Al-Hussain, Grade 1, an award presented by King Abdullah II, Kingdom of Jordan for efforts helping disabled people. (2005)
 Chancellor's Medal by Syracuse University (SU) on 16 November 2012 for his key role in helping to launch a collaborative partnership between SU and Princess Nora bint Abdul Rahman University.
 CEO KSA Award for Tourism & Hospitality presented by the Arabian Business Magazine on 2012.
 Leadership Award presented by the Arab Hotel Investment Conference (AHIC) on 4 May 2014.
 King Leopold Medal was awarded to Sultan on 26 January 2014 by the order of King Philip of Belgium in recognition for contribution in strengthening relations between Saudi Arabia and Belgium, especially in the field of archaeology.
 Middle East Municipalities Award in Cultural & Heritage Preservation presented by the Institute of Middle East Excellence Awards on 16 October 2014
 Harvard University named Sultan bin Salman as the Chief Representative of the Arabian Region and the Middle East in Tourism Leaders program in October 2014
 Creativity Award presented by the Souq Okaz Higher Committee in January 2015
 Arabic Leadership Award in the Care of Disabled presented by the Arab Hospital Federation in December 2015
 UNWTO Award in recognition of His significant contribution to the development of tourism in the Middle East and His outstanding commitment to the global vision and work of the World Tourism Organization. Presented at the 22nd Session of the UNWTO General Assembly held in Chengdu, China on 12 September 2017

Ancestry

References

External links

Sultan
Sultan
1956 births
Sultan
Living people
Military personnel of the Gulf War
Officiers of the Légion d'honneur
People from Riyadh
Recipients of the Order of Leopold II
Sultan
Saudi Arabian astronauts
Saudi Arabian aviators
Sultan
Space Shuttle program astronauts
Syracuse University alumni
University of Denver alumni